Sultan Muhammad Muzaffar Khan was a chief of the Bomba Tribe. He is the namesake for the city of Muzaffarabad in present-day Azad Kashmir. Khan united various hill tribes near the Kashmir–Hazara border region and convinced them to settle near the site of two rivers: the Jhelum River and Neelum River.

Sources
 Delhi Sultans and Rajas 1300-1526

References

Year of birth missing
People from Muzaffarabad District
People from Azad Kashmir
Year of death missing